Vobasine is a naturally occurring monoterpene indole alkaloid found in several species in the genus Tabernaemontana including Tabernaemontana divaricata.

History
Vobasine was first reported by Renner in 1959 after its isolation from Voacanga africana. The two structurally related compounds, dregamine and tabernaemontanine, where its alkene (=CHCH3) sidechain was reduced to ethyl groups in two configurations, had their relationship confirmed in the 1970s. Vobasine has been found in many plants of the dogbane (Apocynaceae) family including Tabernaemontana dichotoma.

Synthesis

Biosynthesis

As with other Indole alkaloids, the biosynthesis of vobasine starts from the amino acid tryptophan. This is converted into strictosidine before further elaboration.

Chemical synthesis
The synthesis of alkaloids with the same carbon skeleton as vobasine began in the 1960s and has continued, with some work providing enantiospecific approaches to closely-related compounds.

Natural occurrence

Vobasine is found commonly in the genera Tabernaemontana and Voacanga, including the species Ervatamia hirta, Tabernaemontana elegans, Tabernaemontana divaricata and Voacanga africana.

Biochemistry  
Plant metabolites have been of interest for their possible biological activity and alkaloids in particular are major subjects for ethnobotanical research. Vobasine has been studied, for example as a potential anti-cancer agent and for its hypotensive activity. However, the alkaloid itself has not been developed as a drug.

Toxicity
Very high dose of vobasine at around 300mg/kg may cause death through CNS and respiratory depression.

See also 
 Ervaticine
 Voacristine

References

Further reading
 
 

Indole alkaloids
Alkaloids found in Apocynaceae